Everett Historic District may refer to:
 Everett Historic District (Peninsula, Ohio), listed on the NRHP in Ohio
 Everett Historic District (Everett, Pennsylvania), listed on the NRHP in Pennsylvania